Brdów  is a village in the administrative district of Gmina Babiak, within Koło County, Greater Poland Voivodeship, in central Poland.

History 
 3700 BC – The first traces of people in the present Brdów.
 1136 – The first written mention about Brdów.
 1325 – The first mention about Catholic parish in Brdów.
 1399 – The first mention of a brick church.
 1436:
 King of Poland Ladislaus of Varna brought to Brdów the Pauline Fathers Order from Jasna Gora and gave them into the care of church in Brdów.
 Brdów gained town privileges.
 1450 – Built the first school in Brdów.
 1476 – City of Brdów became a royal property.
 1562 – The renewal of civic rights of Brdów by king of Poland Sigismund II Augustus.
 1584 – Built a hospital in Brdów.
 1655 – Destruction of the city by the Swedes.
 1824 – Construction of the factory in Brdów.
 1863 – Battle of Brdów in Nowiny Brdowskie.
 1870 – Loss of civic rights.
 1893 – In Brdów lived 1 894 people.
 1909 – Built a new building of school (at Church Street).
 1938 – Built a new building of school (at Adam Mickiewicz Street).
 1939:
 Destruction of the town by the Germans.
 Opened the hospital in place of new school (at Adam Mickiewicz Street).
 1983:
 Coronation of Image of Our Lady of Victories of Brdów by Pope John Paul II.
 Fire of church.
 1999 – Start of international cooperation with Airėnai (in Lithuania)
 2004 – The Society of Friends of the Earth of Brdów (Towarzystwo Przyjaciół Ziemi Brdowskiej).
 2007 – Expansion of the school building.
 2009 – Construction of new building of kindergarten.
 2010 – In Brdów was a car accident, which killed 5 people.
 2011 – Wind farm built in Brdów.

Famous people 

Famous people associated with Brdów:
 Andrzej Kreutz-Majewski - stage designer
 Augustyn Kordecki - Pauline monk
 Bronisław Matyszczyk - Pauline monk
 Eleonora Kiełczewska - mother of Pola Negri
 Florian Piskorski - American Polonia activist
 Jakub Krzyżanowski - grandfather of Frédéric Chopin
 Jan Skarbek - nobleman
 Józef Markowski - poet and priest
 Karol Libelt, senior - philosopher
 Karol Libelt, junior - insurgent
 Korneliusz Jemioł - Pauline monk
 Léon Young de Blankenheim - commander of the insurgent troops
 Mieczysław Wejman - Rector of the Academy of Fine Arts in Kraków
 Pola Negri - actress
 Ladislaus of Varna - king of Poland and Lithuanian Grand Duke
 Zachariasz Jabłoński - journalist, theologian and priest

Church 
Brdów is a local center of Catholic religion. Here is a St Adalbert's of Prague Church of a Pauline Fathers in Brdów. The church has existed since 1325.

Population 
 1777: 331 people
 1827: 794 people
 1859: 863 people
 1902: 1,894 people
 1946: 700 people
 1999: 818 people
 2002: 850 people
 2005: 900 people
 2014: 950 people

Gallery

References

Villages in Koło County
Brześć Kujawski Voivodeship
Kalisz Governorate
Łódź Voivodeship (1919–1939)
Poznań Voivodeship (1921–1939)